Dakota Abberton (born in Maroubra, New South Wales), an Australian surfer, is a member of the Australian surf gang the Bra Boys. Together with his brothers, Koby, Jai, and Sunny, Dakota Abberton achieved national and international attention in 2007 with the release of a feature-length documentary entitled Bra Boys: Blood is Thicker than Water, that was written and directed by the Bra Boys.

Robbery and assault charges 
In March 2011 Abberton was arrested and charged with aggravated robbery, affray, destruction of property, two counts of assault occasioning actual bodily harm and drugs charges following the assault and robbery of a woman. In March 2011, he was granted strict conditional bail after his lawyer argued that the injuries sustained by the victim were caused by other people. In October 2012, Abberton pleaded guilty to two charges of assault occasioning actual bodily harm, reckless wounding in company and damaging property. In February 2013, Abberton was sentenced to 21 months imprisonment but avoided jail time because the NSW District Court ordered that he serve it by way of an intensive correction order (ICO).

References

Criminals from Sydney
Living people
Australian surfers
People from the Eastern Suburbs (Sydney)
Year of birth missing (living people)